Davao Light and Power Company, Inc. is a Davao-based Filipino electricity company and the third largest privately owned electric utility in the Philippines and is owned by Aboitiz Power Corporation (AboitizPower). In 2007, the company had 247,341 customers and 290,000 customers in 2012. It serves Davao City and some parts of the Province of Davao Del Norte namely: Panabo City, Carmen, Braulio E. Dujali, Sto. Tomas, and some portions of Asuncion and Kapalong.

The company was founded in 1929 and originally owned by P. H. Frank but was sold to Jon Ramon Aboitiz in 1941.

A house bill seeking to expand its franchise area was vetoed by Pres. Bongbong Marcos on July 27, 2022.

References

External links
 

Electric power companies of the Philippines
Companies based in Davao City